Fanafo (or Se) is an Espiritu Santo language of Vanuatu. It is spoken by 20 people in Vanafo and Butmas villages of eastern Santo Island.

References

Tryon, Darrell. 2010. The languages of Espiritu Santo, Vanuatu. In John Bowden and Nikolaus P. Himmelmann and Malcolm Ross (eds.), A journey through Austronesian and Papuan linguistic and cultural space: papers in honour of Andrew K. Pawley, 283-290. Canberra: Research School of Pacific and Asian Studies, Australian National University.

Malekula languages
Languages of Vanuatu